The 7th Ulster Trophy was a non-championship Formula Two motor race held at the Dundrod Circuit on 16 May 1953. The race was held over two heats of 10 laps and a final of 14 laps. Mike Hawthorn driving a Ferrari 500 won the final from pole position ahead of the Cooper T23-Bristol of Ken Wharton and the Ferrari 500 of Bobbie Baird. Hawthorn also set fastest lap in the final, and overall fastest lap in the second heat which he also won, again from pole position. Stirling Moss in a Connaught Type A-Lea Francis set pole and fastest lap in the first heat but finished second behind Duncan Hamilton's HWM-Alta. Moss failed to start the final, while Hamilton finished sixth.

Results

References

Ulster Trophy
Ulster Trophy
Ulster Trophy